Armen Arslanian (9 July 1960 – 18 May 2015) was a Lebanese cyclist. He competed in the individual road race at the 1992 Summer Olympics.

References

External links
 

1960 births
2015 deaths
Lebanese male cyclists
Olympic cyclists of Lebanon
Cyclists at the 1992 Summer Olympics
Place of birth missing